Orchelimum campestre, the dusky-faced meadow katydid, is a species of meadow katydid in the family Tettigoniidae. It is found in North America and Southern Asia.

References

campestre
Articles created by Qbugbot
Insects described in 1893